Sir Henry Talbot of Templeogue, County Dublin, and Mount Talbot, County Roscommon, was a seventeenth-century Irish Catholic landowner, who was elected MP for Newcastle Borough in 1640. His marriage made him a brother-in-law of Richard Talbot, 1st Earl of Tyrconnell.

Birth and origins 
Henry was born in about 1600, probably at Templeogue, County Dublin, the second son of Robert Talbot and his wife Eleanor Colley. His father was a member of the landed gentry, seated at Templeogue. Richard Talbot (died 1577) of Templeogue, Chief Justice of the Irish Common Pleas, who married Alice Burnell, sister of Henry Burnell, MP and judge, was one of his great-grandfathers. His father's family was a cadet branch of the Talbots, an Old English family.

His mother was the second daughter of Henry Colley, of Carbury Castle, County Kildare, by his second wife, Catherine Cusack.

Henry had an elder brother John, who inherited the estate at their father's death in 1616, but died childless in 1627.

Marriage and children 
Talbot married Margaret (died 1662), the third daughter of Sir William Talbot, 1st Baronet of Carton, County Kildare, and his wife Alison Netterville. The marriage made him a brother-in-law of Richard Talbot, who would later become Earl of Tyrconnell.

 
Henry and Margaret had two sons:
 James (died 1691), colonel in the Irish army, married Bridget Bermingham and was killed at the Battle of Aughrim
 William (d. 1729), his successor

—and six daughters:
 Elizabeth, who married John Talbot of Belgard Castle, County Dublin
 Bridget
 Mary (died 1691), who married Theobald Dillon, 7th Viscount Dillon and was accidentally killed during the Siege of Limerick
 Alice
 Ellen
 Barbara

Later life 
Talbot was elected MP for Newcastle Borough in 1640. 

In August 1642 Talbot together with John Dongan went to see the King in England and then stayed there and fought for him in the English Civil War. He was knighted by the James Butler, arquess of Ormond in October 1646 in Kilkenny.

After the Restoration of Charles II in 1660, Talbot was accused of treasonous participation in the Irish Confederate Wars of the 1640s. However, he was acquitted after being found to be an "innocent Papist", allowing him to recover his estates, which had been confiscated by the English Republic during the Cromwell era. His brother-in-law Richard was an influential figure at court and helped him to demonstrate his innocence and recover his lands.

Death 
Talbot died (probably in the 1670s or 1680s) and was succeeded by his eldest son, James, who would be killed at the Battle of Aughrim in 1691.

Notes and references

Notes

Citations

Sources 

  – 1221 to 1690
 
  – (for Talbot of Mount Talbot)
 
  – Dacre to Dysart (for Dillon)
 
  – Parliaments & Biographies (PDF downloadable from given URL)
  – Normans, English, Huguenots etc.
  – Knights bachelors & Index

Further reading 
  – Does not seem to be available online

17th-century Irish people
Irish knights
People from County Dublin
Henry
Year of birth unknown
Year of death unknown